Baek Dong-kyu (born 30 May 1991) is a South Korean footballer who plays as defender for FC Anyang in K League 2.

Career
Baek was selected by FC Anyang in the 2014 K League draft. He joined Jeju United on 9 July 2015. On 31 May 2017, Baek charged onto the field while a substitute and struck Urawa player Yuki Abe in the late minute in a 2017 AFC Champions League match against Urawa Red Diamonds. Baek was given a red card even as a substitute He was banned for three months in all AFC-related matches and fined $15,000 for his violent conduct.

References

External links 

1991 births
Living people
Association football defenders
South Korean footballers
FC Anyang players
Jeju United FC players
Gimcheon Sangmu FC players
K League 2 players
K League 1 players